Agave chrysantha, the golden-flowered century plant, is a plant species endemic to Arizona. The species is distinguished by its bright yellow flowers, born on a flowering stalk up to 7 m (21 feet) tall.

References

chrysantha
Flora of Arizona